Ronald S. Brookmeyer (born on September 4, 1954) is an American public health researcher. He is a professor of biostatistics at the UCLA Fielding School of Public Health.

Early life and education
Brookmeyer was born on September 4, 1954 in New York, USA. He completed his Bachelor of Science degree in mathematics from Cooper Union and his Master's degree and PhD from the University of Wisconsin. During his time at Cooper Union, he developed a mathematical model of the parasite-host relationship on the population growth of schistosomiasis.

Career
Following his PhD, Brookmeyer joined the faculty at Johns Hopkins Bloomberg School of Public Health (JHU). During his tenure at JHU, Brookmeyer focused on creating tools using statistical, informational, and mathematical sciences to address the HIV/AIDS epidemic. In 1992, he was awarded the Mortimer Spiegelman gold medal by the American Public Health Association for contributions to health statistics. Beyond Johns Hopkins, Brookmeyer also taught a series of workshops on biostatistics in China at the request of the Chinese Centers for Disease Control, becoming one of the first biostatisticians in China teaching biostatistics. He also served on the editorial board of the journal Statistics in Medicine from 1985 to 1994. As a result of his public health efforts, Brookmeyer was also chosen to develop statistical models to evaluate the public health response following 9/11 and to rapidly address biosecurity and bioterrorism emergencies in the future.

By 2006, Brookmeyer was appointed Chair of JHU's Master of Public Health Program and was elected chair of the Statistics Section of American Association for Advancement of Science (AAAS). The following year, he was also elected a member of the Institute of Medicine (now referred to as the National Academy of Medicine). He eventually left JHU in 2010 to join the faculty at the UCLA Fielding School of Public Health.

UCLA
Upon joining the faculty at UCLA, Brookmeyer was awarded the President's Citation from Cooper Union "for the development of new statistical methods and models for tracking the spread and consequences of disease." Following this, he was elected to a five-year term on the statistical board of reviewing editors for Science. In the same year, Brookmeyer was also named the 2014 Norman Breslow Distinguished Lecturer at the University of Washington. In 2015, Brookmeyer received the Nathan Mantel Lifetime Achievement Award from American Statistical Association's Section on Statistics in Epidemiology for his "valuable lifetime contributions at the intersection of statistical science and epidemiology."

In January 2020, Brookmeyer was named dean of the UCLA Fielding School of Public Health. During the COVID-19 pandemic, he advocated for the development of a new approach to clinical trials conducted during pandemics. In the co-authored paper, the researchers suggested a "core-protocol concept" to clinical trials, which could be applied across infectious disease outbreaks and allow for the addition of new team members over time. He was also named chair of the UCLA’s COVID-19 Future Planning Task Force.

Selected publications
AIDS Epidemiology: A Quantitative Approach (1992)

References

External links

Living people
1954 births
Cooper Union alumni
University of Wisconsin–Madison alumni
Johns Hopkins University faculty
University of California, Los Angeles faculty
Members of the National Academy of Medicine